This is a list of political parties that were or are currently banned.

By country

Argentina
In 1943, Pedro Pablo Ramírez banned all political parties after overthrowing the government.

Austria

Algeria

Bhutan

Brazil
The Brazilian Communist Party was suppressed during the Vargas Era, but were later able to participate in the 1945 and 1947 elections. However, the party was banned by Eurico Gaspar Dutra in May 1947, and all of its elected officials, baring those elected with support from other parties, were removed from office.

Brazilian Integralist Action was banned after the Integralist Uprising in 1938.

Bulgaria
All political parties were banned in Bulgaria in 1934.

Canada

Cambodia

Czech Republic

China

Egypt

Eswatini

Germany
All political parties were banned in the Protectorate of Bohemia and Moravia after the annexation of Czechoslovakia. During World War II political parties in Luxembourg and Norway were banned following their occupations by Germany.

Greece
Prime Minister Ioannis Metaxas banned all political parties in 1936. Golden Dawn was ruled as a criminal organization in 2020. A law passed in 2023 prohibiting parties led by people convicted of crimes from running in elections resulted in Golden Dawn and National Party – Greeks being prohibited from the 2023 Greek legislative election.

Haiti

Hong Kong

Iran

Indonesia

Iraq

Italy

Netherlands

Nepal
King Tribhuvan of Nepal banned the Communist Party of Nepal. The Nepali Congress, under the leadership of BP Koirala, won the 1959 election, but King Mahendra of Nepal dissolved the House of Representatives on 15 December 1960. The Rastriya Panchayat was formed and all political parties were banned.

A referendum was held in 1980 to determine whether to maintain the Panchayat system or institute a multi-party system. The Panchayat system was maintained with 54% of the vote. On 6 April 1990, King Birendra of Nepal ended the ban on political parties in response to the 1990 Nepalese revolution and the 1991 election was the first multi-party election since 1960.

Kazakhstan

Russia

Romania
Prime Minister Patriarch Miron of Romania banned all political parties in 1939.

South Korea

Spain
Batasuna was the first political party banned following the end of Francisco Franco's dictatorship.

Sri Lanka

Sudan
Jaafar Nimeiry overthrew the government in 1969, and banned all political parties. He was overthrown by a coup d'état in 1985, and a new government was formed by Abdel Rahman Swar al-Dahab. He legalized political parties, but were banned again after Omar al-Bashir overthrew the government.

Thailand

Tunisia

Turkey

Ukraine

United States

Vietnam

References

Works cited
 
 
 
 
 
 

 
Banned